"New Shade of Blue" is a song written by John McFee and Andre Pessis, and recorded by American country music group Southern Pacific. It was released in July 1988 as the second single from the album Zuma.  The song reached number 2 on the Billboard Hot Country Singles & Tracks chart.

Charts

Weekly charts

Year-end charts

References

1988 singles
Southern Pacific (band) songs
Song recordings produced by Jim Ed Norman
Songs written by John McFee
Warner Records singles
1988 songs
Songs written by Andre Pessis